Gorentla is a village in Suryapet district of the Indian state of Telangana. It is located in Maddirala mandal.gorentla is one of the developing village in telangana state in a modernize way

References

Villages in Suryapet district